Tambara District is a district of Manica Province in western Mozambique. The principal town is Nhacolo. The district is located in the north of the province, and borders with Tete Province in the north, Chemba District of Sofala Province in the east, Maringué District of Sofala Province in the southeast, Macossa District in the south, and with Guro District in the west. It has a population of 41,339 as of 2007.

Geography
The district is located on the left bank of the Zambezi.

Demographics
As of 2005, 51% of the population of the district was younger than 15 years. 16% did speak Portuguese. The most common mothertongue is Chitwe language. 84% were analphabetic, mostly women.

Administrative divisions
The district is divided into three postos, Nhacolo (three localities), Búzua (two localities), and Nhacafula (one locality).

Economy
Less than 1% of the households in the district have access to electricity.

Agriculture
In the district, there are 7,500 farms which have on average  of land. The main agricultural products are corn, cassava, cowpea, peanut, sorghum, and sweet potato.

Transportation

References

Districts in Manica Province